Kerasochori is a Greek village in Evrytania regional unit. It is located in the east part of Evrytania, built at a height of 1000 meters on the south slope of Agrafa range. It is the seat of Agrafa municipality, and Viniani municipal unit. Its population is 174 residents according to 2011 Greek census.

History
At the Ottoman years, Kerasochori is described, in the few sources of that period, as a big and flourishing village. Those years it was named Kerasovo. In 1821, during Greek War of Independence, the Greek chieftain Kostas Vellis or Stergiopoulos proclaimed the revolution in Agrafa region, from Kerasochori. After the liberation of Greece, Kerasochori was chosen as the seat of Agraion municipality, an old local municipality of Evrytania. In 1930, the village was renamed from Kerasovo to Kerasochori. The current name means in Greek village of cherries.

Historical population

References

External links
Agrafa municipality

Populated places in Evrytania